Jamaica competed at the 1968 Summer Olympics in Mexico City, Mexico.

Medalists

References
Official Olympic Reports
International Olympic Committee results database

Nations at the 1968 Summer Olympics
1968
1968 in Jamaican sport